Our Lady Help of Christians (German) is a historic Catholic church at the corner of East Allegheny Avenue and Gaul Street in the Port Richmond section of Philadelphia, Pennsylvania and serves the German-speaking population in the area.

The parish was founded in 1885 and the church was constructed in 1898. The parish was merged with Nativity of the Blessed Virgin Mary church in 2016, and the two churches located one block away from each other operated until Our Lady Help of Christians was closed on June 4, 2018. Leading up to its closure, the Church struggled financially, with under 300 attendees per weekend and substantial deferred maintenance costs. As of 2021, the church building remains vacant but intact. Additional vacant components of the property include a rectory, convent, and school building.

Parish boundary
All German-speaking people: east, Delaware River; south, Lehigh Ave.; west, Kensington Ave. and E St.; north, Wheatsheaf La.

Former Masses conducted
Vigil Mass, Saturdays, 5 PM. Sundays, 10 AM. Holydays, 9 AM; 7 PM. At the time of its closing, the parish no longer celebrated any Masses in German

Related school
Students Attend: Our Lady of Port Richmond Regional School, 3233 E. Thompson St. 19134. This new school was founded through a merger of the Our Lady Help of Christians, Nativity B.V.M, and St. Adalbert Catholic Schools on the site of St. St. Adalbert.

See also
 St. Adalbert in Philadelphia

References

Roman Catholic churches in Philadelphia
Roman Catholic churches in Pennsylvania
History of Catholicism in the United States
1898 establishments in Pennsylvania
Port Richmond, Philadelphia
19th-century Roman Catholic church buildings in the United States